Peter Vredenburgh may refer to:

Peter Vredenburgh Jr. (1837–1864), lawyer and Union Army officer in the American Civil War
Peter Vredenburgh (judge) (1805–1873), associate justice of the New Jersey Supreme Court
Peter Vredenburgh (politician) (1836–1915), member of the Wisconsin State Assembly